Niccolò Salvietti (born 3 November 1993) is an Italian racing cyclist, who currently rides for UCI Continental team . He competed in the men's team time trial event at the 2017 UCI Road World Championships.

Major results
2017
 7th Belgrade Banjaluka I
2019
 3rd Gemenc Grand Prix I

References

External links
 

1993 births
Living people
Italian male cyclists
Place of birth missing (living people)
Sportspeople from the Metropolitan City of Florence
Cyclists from Tuscany